Denis Jack (born 12 January 1941) is a retired Scottish professional football left back who made over 280 appearances in the Scottish League for Cowdenbeath and Forfar Athletic.

Career statistics

Honours 
Cowdenbeath

 Scottish League Second Division second-place promotion: 1969–70

Individual

Cowdenbeath Hall of Fame

References 

Scottish footballers
Cowdenbeath F.C. players
Scottish Football League players
Association football fullbacks
Forfar Athletic F.C. players
1941 births
Living people
People from Cowdenbeath